Seota is a census town in the Mandu CD block in the  Ramgarh subdivision of the Ramgarh district in the Indian state of Jharkhand.

Geography

Location                                         

Area overview
Ramgarh has a vibrant coal-mining sector. The map alongside provides links to five operational areas of Central Coalfields spread across South Karanpura Coalfield, Ramgarh Coalfield and West Bokaro Coalfield. Four of the six CD blocks in the district have coal mines – Patratu, Ramgarh, Mandu and Chitarpur. The high concentration of census towns in these blocks are noticeable on the map. Only two blocks, Gola and Dulmi, are totally rural areas. Ramgarh district lies in the central part of the Chota Nagpur Plateau. The Damodar valley covers most of the district. The forested areas in highlands to the north and the south of the valley can be seen in the map (mark the shaded areas). "Chotanagpur has a charm of its own... The entire area forms one of the most charming series of views imaginable. The far-off hills in the background in exquisite tints of blue or purple as the light falls, the nearer hills picturesquely shaped and luxuriant in every shade of green with their bold escarpments in black or grey, and the brown plains below furnishing their quota of colours." 

Note: The map alongside presents some of the notable locations in the district. All places marked in the map are linked in the larger full screen map.

Demographics
According to the 2011 Census of India, Seota had a total population of 6,554, of which 3,459 (53%) were males and 3,095 (47%) were females. Population in the age range 0-6 years was 861. The total number of literate persons in Bongabar was 4,815 (84.58% of the population over 6 years).

Infrastructure
According to the District Census Handbook 2011, Ramgarh, Seota covered an area of 2.163 km2. Among the civic amenities, it had 7 km roads with open drains, the protected watersupply involved hand pump, uncovered well. It had 1,244 domestic electric connections, 60 road lighting points. Among the medical facilities, it had 4 hospitals, 1 dispensary, 1 health centre, 1 family welfare centre, 2 maternity and child welfare centres, 2 maternity homes, 4 nursing homes, 4 charitable hospital/ nursing homes, 5 medicine shops. Among the educational facilities it had 6 primary schools, 1 middle school, other educational facilities at Ramgarh Cantonment 3 km away. It had 1 non-formal educational centre (Sarva Siksha Abhiyan). An important commodity it produced was coal. It had the branch office of 1 nationalised bank, 1 agricultural credit society.

Transport
There is a station nearby at Ranchi Road on the Barkakana–Netaji S.C.Bose Gomoh line.

Seota is off National Highway 20.

References

Cities and towns in Ramgarh district